Kayvin Acupicup Santos, also known on his stage name Kevin Santos, is a Filipino actor and was discovered in the Philippine over-all talent competition, StarStruck.

Personal life 
Santos graduated high school through the Alternative Learning System in which he is homeschooled. He studied aviation course to be a pilot at Omni Aviation Corporation in Angeles City. He finished cum laude on a degree in political science at Arellano University.

Starstruck 
Kevin Santos was included in the Final 14 of StarStruck wherein Ryza Cenon and Mike Tan won as the Ultimate Survivors. He was eliminated contestant that was followed by the Bb. Pilipinas 2007 contestant Ailyn Luna.

Post StarStruck 
Shortly after the contest, Santos underwent various workshops and TV guestings in 2004 while waiting for his break. In 2008, he hired Joe Barrameda to co-manage his showbiz career with GMA Artist Center.

Since then he has frequently played supporting and comedic roles in television dramas, including roles in Basahang Ginto, My Husband's Lover, Ismol Family, Poor Señorita, and Kambal Karibal.

In 2013, he top billed his first gay role in My Husband's Lover as Danny, the best friend of Eric (Dennis Trillo); where he got a lot of positive feedback from the fans of the show.

In 2018, he took a private pilot course at Omni Aviation for his licensure as a pilot. Later that month, he managed to ace his two major exams, namely his 350 item DepEd exam and his 625 item Private Pilot exams, that simultaneously scheduled in the same week. On the 27th of March, he announced that he is now a licensed private pilot.

Same that year, Santos had his guest appearance in Kambal Karibal as Xander Liwanag, a key character to the show with black magic powers such as soul-switching and exorcism.

Filmography

Television

Movies

Awards and nominations

References 

1988 births
StarStruck (Philippine TV series) participants
Living people
GMA Network personalities
Tagalog people
Filipino male comedians
Male actors from Manila